Archerfield can refer to:
Archerfield, Queensland, a suburb in Brisbane, Australia
Archerfield Airport
RAAF Station Archerfield, a former RAAF base at Archerfield Airport
Archerfield Estate and Links, a country estate and pair of golf courses in East Lothian, Scotland